Acylophorus is a genus of beetles belonging to the family Staphylinidae.

The genus has cosmopolitan distribution.

Species:
 Acylophorus acufer Lott, 2012 
 Acylophorus acuminatus Sharp, 1876

References

Staphylinidae
Staphylinidae genera